Conor William Hazard (born 5 March 1998) is a Northern Irish professional footballer who plays as a goalkeeper for Scottish Premiership club Celtic and the Northern Ireland national team.

He has previously spent time out on loan at Falkirk, Partick Thistle, Dundee (on two separate spells) and Finnish side HJK Helsinki, with whom he won the 2022 Veikkausliiga.

Club career

Celtic 
Hazard started his career with Cliftonville before joining Celtic, his boyhood club, in July 2014. 

At the beginning of the 2017–18 season, Brendan Rodgers promoted Hazard to the Celtic first-team squad as third choice goalkeeper behind Craig Gordon and Dorus de Vries. On 8 September 2017, Hazard signed a new four-year contract with the then Scottish champions.

Loans
In January 2018, Hazard moved on loan to Scottish Championship club Falkirk. He made his professional debut in a 3–1 victory over Brechin City on 6 February 2018.

Hazard moved on loan to another Scottish Championship club, Partick Thistle, in January 2019. He helped his side reach the quarter-finals of the Scottish Cup, taking Hearts to a replay where Hazard saved a penalty kick but conceded a late goal, the team ultimately losing 2–1 to exit the tournament.

Hazard joined Dundee on an emergency loan in October 2019, replacing regular starter Jack Hamilton who was out after having his appendix removed. Hazard played five games with Dundee before returning to Celtic in November following Hamilton's return. After impressing Dundee manager James McPake during his short stint with the club, Hazard was brought back to the Dark Blues on loan for the rest of the season in January. Hazard again took the starting spot in February, and only conceded one goal in his next six games, grabbing five consecutive clean sheets in the process. However, both Hazard's and Dundee's great run was cut short due to the COVID-19 pandemic, causing the season to be ended early in April 2020.

2020–21 
Hazard made his competitive debut for Celtic on 10 December 2020, in a 3–2 win over Lille in the Europa League. He made a good save near the end of the game from Isaac Lihadji to deny the French side an equaliser. He made his first appearance for Celtic in the Scottish League three days later, keeping a clean sheet in a 2–0 win over Kilmarnock. Hazard started the 2020 Scottish Cup Final against Hearts. The match finished 3–3 after extra time before Celtic won the game in a penalty shootout, during which Hazard saved two penalties from Stephen Kingsley and Craig Wighton. The Northern Irishman subsequently made five appearances in the Scottish Premiership, due to a goalkeeping crisis that involved both the original starter, Vasilis Barkas, and his second-choice, Scott Bain: one of the factors that cost Celtic their tenth consecutive title, as rivals Rangers won the league, instead.

2021–22 and a new loan move 
Ever since the start of the 2021–22 season, with the appointment of Ange Postecoglou as the new Celtic manager, Hazard found himself at the bottom of the pecking order between the sticks of the Hoops (together with Barkas), as Joe Hart became the first-choice goalkeeper immediately after his signing, with Bain being confirmed as the main reserve and Tobi Oluwayemi being promoted to the first team.

After staying in Glasgow for the first part of the season, as he made the match-day squad on a few occasions, on January 19, 2022 Hazard officially joined Finnish side HJK Helsinki on loan for the rest of year. Hazard would make his debut for HJK in a Finnish League Cup match against Inter Turku. Hazard would have a successful season in goal for HJK both domestically and in Europe. He started in 24 league matches and 13 European matches, as HJK qualified for the 2022–23 UEFA Europa League, ultimately going out in the group stage. The season culminated in winning the Veikkausliiga title. Hazard would be named as the Goalkeeper of the Season for the 2022 season.

International career
Hazard made his debut for the Northern Ireland under-19 team on 26 March 2016 at Sportpark Parkzicht in a 1–0 defeat to the Netherlands. He made his first appearance at full international level for Northern Ireland on 3 June 2018, in a 3–0 defeat against Costa Rica.

Career statistics

Honours
Celtic 
Scottish Cup: 2019–20
HJK

 Veikkausliiga: 2022
Individual
Veikkausliiga Goalkeeper of the Year: 2022

References

External links
 
 

1998 births
Living people
Association footballers from Northern Ireland
Association football goalkeepers
Northern Ireland international footballers
Northern Ireland youth international footballers
Scottish Professional Football League players
Celtic F.C. players
Falkirk F.C. players
Partick Thistle F.C. players
Dundee F.C. players
Helsingin Jalkapalloklubi players
Scottish expatriate footballers
Scottish expatriate sportspeople in Finland
Expatriate footballers in Finland
Veikkausliiga players